James Sumner may refer to:

 James Sumner (Medal of Honor) (1840–1912), United States Army soldier and a recipient of the Medal of Honor
 James Sumner (baseball) (1851–1881), American baseball umpire
 James B. Sumner (1887–1955),  American chemist who shared the Nobel Prize in Chemistry
 James Edward (Red) Sumner, Jr. (born 1948), stellar occultation astronomer after whom asteroid 36983 Sumner is named